Ivan Parfenievich Borodin (30 January 1847 - 5 March 1930) was a Russian botanist, academician, and the founding president of the Russian Botanical Society of the Russian Academy of Sciences. He campaigned for the protection of natural spaces.

His wife was Alexandra Grigoryevna and his daughter was the historian Inna Lubimenko.

References 

1847 births
1930 deaths
19th-century botanists from the Russian Empire
20th-century Russian botanists
Members of the Russian Academy of Sciences